Beautiful Existence is an album by American jazz guitarist Joe Morris, which was recorded in 2004 and released on the Portuguese Clean Feed label. He leads a new quartet consisting of the trio with whom he recorded Age of Everything with the addition of alto saxophonist Jim Hobbs.

Reception

In his review for AllMusic, Steve Loewy states " Morris is a superb composer, too, as he dishes up generally simple though piercing melodies, some of which, such as the slower, yet bubbly Ornette Coleman-influenced 'Some Good' are infused with an attractive bluesy tinge."

The Penguin Guide to Jazz states "This is a powerful statement, with a kind of chastened beauty, from a label that seems determined to catch anything new and exciting in contemporary music on the fly."

The All About Jazz review by Troy Collins says "With hauntingly atmospheric modal grooves, tender, reflective ballads and invigorating, angular free bop, Morris's singular talents as a guitarist have never been more evident."

Track listing
All compositions by Joe Morris
 "Smear Spring" – 6:30
 "Some Good" – 9:27
 "Knew Something" – 9:27
 "Real Reason" – 4:54
 "King Cobra" – 9:23
 "Beautiful Existence" – 12:02

Personnel
 Joe Morris - guitar
 Jim Hobbs – alto sax
 Timo Shanko – bass
 Luther Gray – drums

References

2005 albums
Joe Morris (guitarist) albums
Clean Feed Records albums